Patricia Obo-Nai is a Ghanaian engineer, the first Ghanaian to become Chief Executive Officer of Vodafone Ghana. Her appointment on 19 February 2019 took effect on 1 April 2019. She is a member of the Ghana Institution of Engineers, (GHIE) and Vodafone's executive committee. In May 2021, she was named among top 50 Most Influential Female Leaders in Africa within the corporate and business sphere by Leading Ladies Africa.

Education 
For her O-Levels and A-Levels she attended St Roses Senior High (Akwatia) and the Presbyterian Boys' Senior High School respectively. She continued at the Kwame Nkrumah University of Science and Technology where she obtained a bachelor's degree in electrical engineering. She holds an Executive MBA and Executive Education degree from the University of Ghana and Kellogg School of Management in USA respectively. She also acquired an Executive Education degree from INSEAD in France.

Career 
Obo-Nai has worked in information technology and telecommunications since 1997. Before her appointment at Vodafone, she worked with Millicom Ghana Limited, operators of Tigo for 14 years. She joined Vodafone in 2011 and worked as a Chief Technology Officer and a member of the Executive Committee. Then she was promoted as the Director of Fixed Business and Customer Operations before she was appointed as CEO in 2019.

Awards and honours 
For her work she has received the following awards:

 2012 - Best Female Technologist Award at the annual Ghana Telecom Awards in June
2017 - Distinguished Alumnus from the College of Engineering at KNUST
 2018 - Listed as one of the 100 most inspiring women leaders in Vodafone
 2019 - Won the Presec "Odade3" Honorary Torch Award
2020 - Ghana Women of Excellence Awards
2020 National Communications Awards Telecommunications Personality of the Year
2020 Sustainability and Social Impact (SSI) Awards STEM Leadership Award
2020 Ghana Information Technology and Telecom Awards (GITTA) Telecom CEO of the Year
2020 Young Professional Role Model in Women Executive Leadership Award
2021 Women Leadership Excellence Award at Ghana CEO’s Network Summit
2021 Africa’s Most Respected CEO Awards in the continent’s Telecommunications Industry

References

Living people
University of Ghana alumni
Kwame Nkrumah University of Science and Technology alumni
Kellogg School of Management alumni
INSEAD alumni
Year of birth missing (living people)
Presbyterian Boys' Senior High School alumni
Alumni of St Roses Senior High school (Akwatia)
Ghanaian women engineers